Zgornji Prhovec ( or ; in older sources also Perhovic) is a settlement north of Izlake in the Municipality of Zagorje ob Savi in central Slovenia. The area is part of the traditional region of Upper Carniola. It is now included with the rest of the municipality in the Central Sava Statistical Region.

Name
The name of the settlement was changed from Prhovec to Zgornji Prhovec in 1990.

References

External links
Zgornji Prhovec on Geopedia

Populated places in the Municipality of Zagorje ob Savi